Acanthodactylus felicis, also known commonly as the cat fringe-fingered lizard or the  South Arabian fringe-toed lizard, is a species of lizard in the family Lacertidae. The species is endemic to the Arabian Peninsula.

Etymology
The specific name, felicis, refers to Arabia Felix, the Latin name for South Arabia.

Geographic range
A. felicis is found in Yemen and Oman.

Reproduction
A. felicis is oviparous.

References

Further reading
Arnold EN (1980). "The Reptiles and Amphibians of Dhofar, Southern Arabia". Journal of Oman Studies. Special Report No. 2: 273–332. (Acanthodactylus felicis, new species, pp. 300–303).
Salvador, Alfredo (1982). "A revision of the lizards of the genus Acanthodactylus (Sauria: Lacertidae)". Bonner Zoologische Monographien (16): 1–167. (Acanthodactylus felicis, pp. 50–53, Figures 17–19, Map 9). (in English, with an abstract in German).
van der Kooij, Jeroen (2001). "The herpetofauna of the Sultanate of Oman: Part 3: The true lizards, skinks, and monitor lizards". Podarcis 2 (1): 15–26.

Acanthodactylus
Reptiles described in 1980
Taxa named by Edwin Nicholas Arnold